Nada Awar Jarrar is a Lebanese novelist. Her novel, Somewhere, Home, won the Commonwealth Writers' Prize, Best First Book, South East Asia and South Pacific.

She has lived in London, Paris, Sydney and Washington D.C. She is married; they have a daughter and live in Beirut.

Works
Somewhere, home, Heinemann, 2003,  
Dreams of Water, Harper, 2007,  
A good land, HarperCollins, 2009, 
 An Unsafe Haven, The Borough Press, 2016

Non-fiction

References

External links
 
Reviews
"Reviews", Third Way, April 2007
"Dreams of Water", Gutter Poetry in the Arab World, November 22, 2008

Lebanese novelists
Writers from Beirut
Year of birth missing (living people)
Living people
Lebanese women writers